The Mythe Water Treatment Works in Tewkesbury, Gloucestershire, England is a facility which treats water drawn from the River Severn.

On 1 March 2002, Severn Trent Water worked with local councillors to create an emergency plan, which was supposed to ensure that in a state of emergency their services would not be affected.

It came to national attention in July 2007 when it became inundated with water from the River Severn during the Summer 2007 United Kingdom floods. The water coming into the plant was contaminated, and this led to the loss of tap water for approximately 150,000 people in Cheltenham, Gloucester and Tewkesbury.

References

External links
Severn Trent report on Mythe Flooding 2007

Tewkesbury
Water treatment facilities
History of Gloucestershire